Eliezer Rafaeli (September 18, 1926 – May 27, 2018) was the Israeli founding President of the University of Haifa.

Biography
Rafaeli was born in Tel Aviv, Israel. He was in the Palmach from 1944 to 1948, and in the Israel Defense Forces from 1948 to 1951. He lived in Kibbutz Mishmar Hanegev from 1946 to 1952, and Kibbutz Maagan Michael from 1952 to 1957.

He taught at The New School for Social Research from 1957 to 1959, and at Columbia University from 1960 to 1963.

Rafaeli was the founding President of the University of Haifa from 1973 to 1977.

In 2000, Rafaeli was the Chancellor of the University of Haifa, and founder of its Jewish-Arab Center.

Rafaeli died on May 27, 2018, and was buried in Degania Bet, Israel.

References 

Palmach members
Kibbutzniks
Academic staff of the University of Haifa
Columbia University faculty
Presidents of universities in Israel
20th-century Israeli military personnel
The New School faculty
1926 births
2018 deaths